The rear naked choke (RNC) is a chokehold in martial arts applied from an opponent's back. The word "naked" in this context suggests that, unlike other strangulation techniques found in jujutsu/judo, this hold does not require the use of a keikogi ("gi") or training uniform.

The choke has two variations: in one version, the attacker's arm encircles the opponent's neck and then grabs their own biceps on the other arm (see below for details); in the second version, the attacker clasps their hands together instead after encircling the opponent's neck. Recent studies have shown that the rear-naked choke takes an average of 8.9 seconds to render an opponent unconscious regardless of the grip that is used.

"Figure four" or "short" variation

This variant is considered to be a "blood choke" because it restricts blood flow to the brain via the carotid arteries. When applied correctly, it can cause temporary unconsciousness in a few seconds. The following is a description of this technique using the right arm:

The attacker's right arm encircles the opponent's neck, with the opponent's trachea at the crook of the elbow.
The attacker's right hand then grasps their own upper left arm [biceps].
The left hand is placed behind (or occasionally on top of) the opponent's head. A more effective form of the choke can be applied by placing the palm of the left hand against the attacker's own shoulder rather than behind the opponent's head. This greatly reduces the escape possibilities.
The elbows are then brought together such that lateral pressure, from the biceps and radius bone, is applied to the neck on both sides.

When applied properly, unconsciousness occurs in less than 10 seconds and recovery from the choke is just as quick.

"Body lock" or "hooks" variation
The placement of the legs usually falls into two categories. The first is a body lock. The attacker places one of their legs across the stomach or lower chest of the victim. They then place their other leg over their own shin, creating a figure-four with their legs. This allows them to limit movement and stay close to the back of their victim. This technique was used by Anderson Silva against Dan Henderson and by Jim Miller against Melvin Guillard. The other common technique is known as using "hooks". In this version the attacker places their legs inside of the victim's legs. They then move their legs out, placing their shin behind the victim's knees, essentially using their shins and feet as hooks to control the victim's legs. This variation leaves the attacker open to the possibility of leglocks from their opponent, as they are attacking the choke.

"Clasping hands" variation 
This variation (also known as Palm to Palm) has the supporting hand clasp the hand of the choking arm, allowing more pressure to be applied to the neck, but losing some of the control of the head. This alters the choke somewhat so that it is more likely to be applied as an airway-restricting choke or mixed blood and air choke, which results in more pain but a slower choke-out. As such, this technique is less frequently used at advanced levels in Judo. Nonetheless, it has seen some successful applications in mixed martial arts competition: for instance, it was used by Fedor Emelianenko, a heavyweight champion in PRIDE, to defeat Kazuyuki Fujita at the PRIDE 26 event in 2003. Fujita tapped out about five seconds after the choke was applied. He used it again to defeat former UFC Heavyweight Champion Tim Sylvia in 36 seconds. Sylvia tapped out immediately once the choke was sunk in and after the fight described it as being very painful. It was also used by Ultimate Fighting Championship fighter Matt Hughes to defeat Frank Trigg in their second fight which was adapted from a hand-on-biceps version of the rear naked choke.
Anderson Silva also used the clasping hands variation when he defeated Dan Henderson in the UFC. Joe Lauzon used this choke in his fight against Melvin Guillard, initially using the standard version, then switching to a palm to palm.

Judo 
In Judo, the rear naked choke is known as Hadaka-jime: "naked choke", one of the 36 constriction techniques of Kodokan Judo in the Shime-waza list.

Technique 
The main characteristic of Hadaka-Jime when compared with other Judo chokes is that it does not require the use of the opponent's clothing, namely their gi lapel, to create the choking tourniquet. It digs the blade of the wrist into the carotid sinus similar to the hand clasp method and uses a lever motion helped by the underhand. It is faster to apply requiring less strength than the figure four/mixed-martial arts version but is more difficult to learn. It is not an air choke but a carotid choke created entirely by the attacker's arms.

Similar non-judo techniques

Hadaka Jime is also recognized as Hadaka-Jime-San in Danzan Ryu jujitsu's twenty-five techniques in the Shimete list. Danzan Ryu also recognizes the Guillotine choke as Hadaka-Jime-Ichi. But the principle is the same as Jiu-Jitsu's ground version.

Included systems 
Systems:
Kodokan Judo, Judo Lists
Danzan Ryu jujitsu, Danza Ryu Lists
Lists:
The Canon Of Judo
Judo technique

Hasami-jime
Kyuzo Mifune demonstrates Hasami-Jime in The Essence of Judo and is described in The Canon Of Judo.*

Others 

Danzan Ryu enumerates three versions of Hadaka-Jime:

1. Ichi (one) Standing neck-break. Two versions:
 Neck twist
 Guillotine
A version of the guillotine, Mae-Hadaka-Jime, is also described in The Canon Of Judo, an authoritative work that covers the history of judo and its predecessor jujutsu.
2. Ni (two) Choke with forearm. This is an air choke with the forearm pressing on the throat.
3. San (three) Figure-4 choke with forearm. This is a blood choke with the forearms and biceps pressing and the sides of the neck.

"Sleeper hold" in professional wrestling

The Sleeper Hold was originated in professional wrestling  by Evan Lewis in the 1880s when pro wrestling was still a legitimate contest. Lewis earned the nickname "Strangler" for his use of the hold and was an accomplished catch wrestler using the hold defeating Ernst Roeber for the world championship before eventually losing the title to Martin Burns. In the southeastern United States this move was also known as the Charleston Choke.

Modern pro wrestling's first "sleeper hold", technically different from a choke, which is a compression of the throat and/or adam's apple, is thought to have been performed by Jim Londos on 29 June 1931. Suspicion abounded as to the nature of Londos' move (which had looked suspiciously like a choke against the windpipe); however, Londos was quoted the next day in The New York Sun as simply having performed "a new hold I perfected which shuts off the jugular vein."

Though Londos' original move may or may not have been inspired by judo's "hadaka jime", pro-wrestling's sleeper and a rear naked choke both share a similar style of execution. However, in order for the sleeper to be used in the performance art-related world of pro-wrestling, the leverage arm is positioned in a relaxed state so the hold is not fully applied.

It is more realistically used by All Elite Wrestling wrestler Samoa Joe (whose wrestling move-set is closer to mixed martial arts). The move has become more of a staple among independent wrestlers, as well as the Japanese wrestlers with the "strong style" of the sport; the most notable being former MMA star Minoru Suzuki.

Catch wrestling's sleeper 

In modern catch wrestling circles, the term "sleeper hold" refers to a variation of the rear naked choke in which the individual performing the hold snakes the leverage arm across the opponent's throat (in the same manner as the traditional rear naked choke) and grasps their opposite shoulder, rather than the biceps. The opposite hand is also placed against the base of the opponent's skull in the form of a closed Hammer Fist, or on top of the head. The attacking wrestler then squeezes their elbows together, pushes forward with the hammer fist (if used), and crunches forward with the abdominal muscles, producing an extremely tight and fast-acting choke.

Safe application 
This choke, in either the figure-four or clasped-hand variation, is an extremely dangerous technique if used thoughtlessly or improperly. When applied as a blood choke in particular, it immediately reduces the supply of oxygen to the brain, leading (as mentioned above) to unconsciousness and ultimately (if not released) to brain damage or death. It is imperative, when using this technique, to be completely aware of your opponent's physical state, and to release the choke at any sign of your opponent losing consciousness. From the sport's inception, no fatalities have been reported as due to choking in judo.

See also 
 Back mount
 Chokehold
 Fainting
 Submission (combat sport)

References

External links 

Rear naked choke BJJ instructions

Grappling positions
Chokeholds